Tones, Shapes & Colors is the debut live album by the American jazz saxophonist Joe Lovano recorded in 1985 and released on the Italian Soul Note label.

Reception
The Allmusic review by Scott Yanow awarded the album 4 stars stating "None of the tunes are simple or based on the chords of standards, but although they did not catch on, the interplay by the musicians, the excellent pacing of tempos and moods, and the consistently satisfying solos make this a set worth searching for".

Track listing
All compositions by Joe Lovano except as indicated
 "Chess Mates" (Ken Werner) - 8:59
 "Compensation" (Werner) - 12:33
 "La Louisiane" - 4:19
 "Tones, Shapes and Colors" - 5:36
 "Ballad for Trane" (Werner) - 10:24
 "In the Jazz Community" - 9:44
 "Nocturne" (Werner) [not included on LP] - 7:32
* Recorded at the Jazz Centre of New York City on November 21, 1985

Personnel
 Joe Lovano – tenor saxophone, gongs
 Ken Werner – piano
 Dennis Irwin – bass
 Mel Lewis – drums

References

External links
 

Black Saint/Soul Note live albums
Joe Lovano live albums
1985 live albums